Jawa 250 type 559 (known popularly as Panelka) was a standard motorcycle made by Jawa Motors from 1962 to 1974. It was preceded by the Jawa 250/353, and its successor was the Jawa 250/592. This was the first 250 cc model to be called Panelka. The Panelka series had the headlamp top nacelle stretched to the end of the handlebar with an oval speedometer instead of a circular speedometer on the headlamp top nacelle. For better security, the FAB switch box was used, whereas in the previous models a PAL switch box with nail type keys were being used.  As in the previous models the rear tail lamp was made of translucent red plastic.

Engine
The new engine was equipped with new a piston and cylinder, having larger intake channels. The carburetor was directly mounted on the cylinder, and the choke was controlled by the throttle grip.

Versions
 Jawa 250/559/02 - manufactured in 1965
 Jawa 250/559/03 - reportedly made several pieces in the years 1963-1964
 Jawa 250/559/04 - from 1964 to 1974
 Jawa 250/559/05 - a famous model with an automatic centrifugal clutch.
 Jawa 250/559/06

Technical specifications
 Frame: Rectangular Tube Frame
 Bore: 65 mm
 Stroke: 75 mm
 Compression Ratio: 7.7:1
 Tires: Early Models: Front 3.00x16, Rear 3.25x16 Later Models: Front 3.25x16, Rear 3.50x16
 Wheelbase: 1335 mm
 Dimensions: Length - 1980 mm, width - 650mm, Height - 1025mm
 Fuel Tank Capacity: 13.5 liters
 Fuel Economy: 30 Kmpl/65mpg

References

250
Standard motorcycles